is the second single of the subgroup Petitmoni. It was released on July 26, 2000 and sold 484,160 copies. It went to number one on the Oricon Charts in Japan.

In 2002, an English-language cover ("Our Youth 1.2.3!") was recorded by Irene Cara for the album Cover Morning Musume Hello! Project!.

Track listing 
 
 Lyrics and composition by Tsunku; Arrangement by Maejima Yasuaki
 
 Lyrics and composition by Tsunku; Arrangement by Konishi Takao
 "Seishun Jidai 1. 2. 3! (Instrumental)"
 "Baisekō Daiseikō! (Instrumental)"

Featured lineup 
 Kei Yasuda
 Maki Goto
 Hitomi Yoshizawa

References

External links 
 "Seishun Jidai 1. 2. 3!/Baisekō Daiseikō!" entry on the Hello! Project official website 

Petitmoni songs
Zetima Records singles
2000 singles
Oricon Weekly number-one singles
Japanese-language songs
Song recordings produced by Tsunku
Songs written by Tsunku
2000 songs